Colares is a city in the north part of Pará, Brazil. The city became famous because of the Colares UFO flap, which later originated the Operação Prato.

References

Municipalities in Pará